Lameh Eslam (also Romanized as Lameh Eslām; also known as  Lam‘eh Eslām, Lam‘eh Eslām-e Bālā, Lam‘eh-ye Eslām, Luma, Lūmeh, and Lyuma) is a village in Minjavan-e Gharbi Rural District, Minjavan District, Khoda Afarin County, East Azerbaijan Province, Iran. At the 2006 census, its population was 234, in 36 families.

References 

Populated places in Khoda Afarin County